Knights of Honor can refer to multiple things:

Knights of Honor, a fraternity from 1873
Knights of Honor (video game), a game situated in medieval Europe